is the 66th single by the J-pop group Morning Musume '18, released in Japan on October 24, 2018.

Track listing

Charts

References

External links 
 Profile on the Hello! Project official website 
 Profile on the Up-Front Works official website 

2018 singles
2018 songs
Japanese-language songs
Morning Musume songs
Songs written by Tsunku
Song recordings produced by Tsunku
Zetima Records singles
Electronic dance music songs